Martin Knowles, better known by his stage name Emalkay, is an English dubstep producer and DJ from Birmingham. He is best known for his 2009 single "When I Look at You", described by Clash as a "monster", which was released on Caspa's Dub Police label. Emalkay released his debut album, Eclipse, in May 2011. Knowles describes his sound as '[...] a mixture of the usual dubstep tropes coupled with what I imagine Sean Pertwee's face sounds like when he is making all those terrible, grimacing expressions in the film Dog Soldiers.'

References

Living people
English record producers
English DJs
Dubstep musicians
Electronic dance music DJs
Year of birth missing (living people)